Stephen Murphy (born 1986) is an Irish hurler who plays as a right corner-back for the Wexford senior team.

Murphy began his inter-county career as a Gaelic footballer with the Tipperary senior team during the 2005 championship. He spent four seasons with the team, winning a Tommy Murphy Cup medal during that time. Murphy later switched codes and made his first appearance for the Wexford hurling team during the 2012 championship.

At club level Murphy is a one-time Tipperary senior football championship medallist with group team Thomas MacDonagh's.

Honours

Player
Tipperary
Tommy Murphy Cup (1): 2005

References

1986 births
Living people
Dual players
Irish schoolteachers
Kilruane MacDonaghs Gaelic footballers
Kilruane MacDonaghs hurlers
St Martin's (Wexford) hurlers
Tipperary inter-county Gaelic footballers
Wexford inter-county hurlers